The Vektor SP1 is an improved 9mm version of the Z-88 pistol (which is a locally produced copy of the Beretta 92F), produced since 1992 by Denel Land Systems (DLS), formerly Lyttelton Engineering Works (LIW).

Design
The Vektor SP1 and SP2 pistols are almost the same save for the calibre and magazines, and broadly based on the Italian Beretta 92 design. SP stands for “Service Pistol” and both weapons are full-sized, holster type pistols of solid construction. Vektor also makes compact versions of both models, marketed as “General models”; these have shorter barrels, slides and grips.

The Vektor SP1 is a short-recoil operated, locked-breech pistol. It uses a Walther-type tilting locking piece, located below the straight-recoiling barrel, to lock it to the slide. The frame is made from aluminium alloy, other parts are steel. The trigger is double-action, with an exposed hammer and a frame-mounted, ambidextrous safety that allows for "cocked and locked" carry. Sights are fixed; the front sight is pinned to the slide, the rear is dovetailed. Magazines are double stack; the magazine release button is located at the base of trigger-guard.

Variant
A .40 S&W caliber version of the SP1 was introduced by LIW/DLS a little later as the Vektor SP2. Both SP-1 and SP-2 pistols are exported to Europe and South America in several variations.

A limited edition SP1 Target pistol was also available. This model features a single action operation, large adjustable sights, straight trigger design, a different trigger guard a compensating weight with longer barrel. They were marked as "Vektor USA: Norfolk VA".

Usage
SP-1 pistol is currently in service with the South African National Defence Force and the South African Police Service. Outside South Africa, the pistol is seen in use of some South-Asian countries, notably Singapore and Malaysia.

Users
 – Grup Gerak Khas of Malaysian Armed Forces, Royal Malaysia Police, Department of Immigration
 – Peruvian Air Force

See also
The Vektor CP1, another pistol by the same manufacturer, is noted for its streamlined, science-fiction appearance.

References

External links 

 Vektor SP1 Owner's Manual

9mm Parabellum semi-automatic pistols
.40 S&W semi-automatic pistols
Police weapons
Semi-automatic pistols of South Africa
Denel
Weapons and ammunition introduced in 1992